Mexcala macilenta is a jumping spider species in the genus Mexcala that lives in Ethiopia and Tanzania. It was first described in 2000.

References

Salticidae
Spiders of Africa
Fauna of Ethiopia
Fauna of Tanzania
Spiders described in 2000
Taxa named by Wanda Wesołowska